The 1973 Centennial Cup is the third Tier II Junior "A" 1973 ice hockey National Championship for the Canadian Junior A Hockey League.

The Centennial Cup was competed for by the winners of the Western Canadian Champions and the Eastern Canadian Champions.

The finals were hosted by the Portage la Prairie Terriers in the city of Brandon, Manitoba and Winnipeg Arena.

The Playoffs

Prior to Regionals
Chatham Maroons (SOJHL) defeated Wexford Raiders (OPJHL) 4-games-to-3
Moncton Hawks (NBJHL) defeated Buchans Miners (NLJHL) 4-games-to-none
Pembroke Lumber Kings (CJHL) defeated St. Paul Vulcans (CAJHL) 4-games-to-1

MCC Finals

Regional Championships
Manitoba Centennial Cup: Portage la Prairie Terriers

Abbott Cup: Portage la Prairie Terriers
Eastern Champions: Pembroke Lumber Kings

Doyle Cup: Penticton Broncos
Anavet Cup: Portage la Prairie Terriers
Dudley Hewitt Cup:  Chatham Maroons
Callaghan Cup: Pembroke Lumber Kings

Roll of League Champions
AJHL: Calgary Canucks
BCJHL: Penticton Broncos
CAJHL: St. Paul Vulcans
CJHL: Pembroke Lumber Kings
MJHL: Portage Terriers
NBJHL: Moncton Hawks
NJAHL: Buchans Miners
OPJHL: Wexford Raiders
QJAHL: St. Jerome Alouettes
SJHL: Humboldt Broncos
SOJAHL: Chatham Maroons

See also
Canadian Junior A Hockey League
Royal Bank Cup
Anavet Cup
Doyle Cup
Dudley Hewitt Cup
Fred Page Cup
Abbott Cup
Mowat Cup

External links
Royal Bank Cup Website

1973
Cup
Ice hockey competitions in Brandon, Manitoba
Centennial Cup 1973
1973 in Manitoba